Coffeed is a "philanthropic artisanal coffee company" with its headquarters in Queens, New York City, USA. The company opened its flagship location in Long Island City in September 2012.  As of June 2019, the flagship location on Northern Boulevard has closed and the LIC Landing has become the new flagship location. By February 2016, Coffeed has a dozen locations in the New York area and one in Seoul, South Korea.  Included among them are LIC Landing, an outdoor café in Hunter's Point South Park, and New Leaf, a restaurant in Manhattan's Fort Tryon Park. Coffee closed all locations and ceased operating in December 2019.

Business model, charitable partners 

Each Coffeed location donates a portion of its revenue (usually 3-10%) to a charitable partner based in the same neighborhood as the store. Current partners include The New York Foundling, New York Restoration Project (NYRP), City Growers, and Community Mainstreaming Associates. Coffeed has donated nearly $250,000 to charity.

References

Coffeehouses and cafés in the United States
Restaurants in New York City
Companies based in Queens, New York
American companies established in 2012
Food and drink companies established in 2012